Le Bouchet-Mont-Charvin (before 2013: Le Bouchet) is a commune in the eastern French department of Haute-Savoie.

See also
Communes of the Haute-Savoie department

References

Communes of Haute-Savoie